Ford Sterling (born George Ford Stich Jr.; November 3, 1883 – October 13, 1939) was an American comedian and actor best known for his work with Keystone Studios. One of the 'Big 4', he was the original chief of the Keystone Cops.

Biography
Born in La Crosse, Wisconsin, he began his career in silent films in 1911 with Biograph Studios. When director Mack Sennett left to set up Keystone Studios in 1912, Sterling followed him. There, he performed  various roles, such as 'Chief Teeheezel' in the Keystone Cops series of slapstick comedies in a successful career that spanned twenty-five years.

From 1913 and throughout the 1910s, Sterling was among the most popular screen comedians in the world. Charlie Chaplin recalled that, when joining Keystone in early 1914, he was at first dismayed to discover that he was expected to imitate Sterling. Chaplin and Sterling played together at least twice on film, in the one-reelers A Thief Catcher and Between Showers (both 1914).

In the 1920s, Sterling abandoned the short comedy format, instead playing supporting roles in both comedic and dramatic feature-length films, such as He Who Gets Slapped (1924) opposite Lon Chaney. After talking pictures came along, Sterling returned to appearing in short comedies.

Sterling was also a renowned amateur photographer, who won many prizes and at one point (in 1924) even had some of his work exhibited at the Louvre.

Death
Making a smooth transition to talking films, Ford Sterling made the last of his more than two hundred and seventy film appearances in 1936. He died in 1939 of a heart attack (following long-standing diabetes) in Los Angeles, California, and is interred in the Hollywood Forever Cemetery.

For his contribution to the motion picture industry, Ford Sterling has a star on the Hollywood Walk of Fame at 6612 Hollywood Blvd.

Selected filmography

 At Coney Island (1912, Short) - The Married Flirt
 The Riot (1913, Short)
 Two Old Tars (1913, Short)
 Fatty at San Diego (1913, Short)
 Fatty's Flirtation (1913, Short)
 Murphy's I.O.U. (1913, Short) - (uncredited)
 His Chum the Baron (1913, Short) - Baron von Sneezer
 That Ragtime Band (1913, Short) - Professor Smelts
 The Foreman of the Jury (1913, Short) - Jones - Foreman of the Jury
 The Gangsters (1913, Short) - Desk Officer
 Barney Oldfield's Race for a Life (1913, Short) - The Villain
 The Waiters' Picnic (1913, Short) - Louis - the Chef
 Peeping Pete (1913, Short) - Neighbor's Husband
 A Bandit (1913, Short) - The Bandit
 For the Love of Mabel (1913, Short) - (uncredited)
 Safe in Jail (1913, Short) - The Constable
 Love and Courage (1913, Short) - (uncredited)
 Professor Bean's Removal (1913, Short) - Professor Bean
 A Game of Pool (1913, Short) - Schmidt
 Mabel's Dramatic Career (1913, Short) - Actor / Onscreen Villain
 The Faithful Taxicab (1913, Short) - Egbert Throckmorton
 When Dreams Come True (1913, Short) - The Peddler
 The Speed Kings (1913, Short) - Papa
 A Ride for a Bride (1913)
 Wine (1913, Short) - The Diner
 Cohen Saves the Flag (1913, Short) - Sgt. Cohen
 Some Nerve (1913, Short) - The Husband
 A Misplaced Foot (1914, Short)
 In the Clutches of the Gang (1914, Short) - Chief Tehiezel
 Tango Tangles (1914, Short) - Band Leader
 A Robust Romeo (1914, Short)
 A Thief Catcher (1914, Short) - Suspicious John
 Between Showers (1914, Short) - Rival Masher
 That Minstrel Man (1914)
 The Sea Nymphs (1914, Short)
 Hogan's Romance Upset (1915, Short) - Fight Spectator (uncredited)
 That Little Band of Gold (1915, Short) - Gassy Gotrox - Tattletale
 Court House Crooks (1915, Short) - The District Attorney
 Dirty Work in a Laundry (1915, Short) - The Desperate Scoundrel
 Fatty and the Broadway Stars (1915, Short) - Keystone Performer
 The Now Cure (1916)
 Yankee Doodle in Berlin (1919) - Kaiser Bill
 Salome vs. Shenandoah (1919, Short) - Ingenue Actress's Father
 Married Life (1920) - Heckler at Theatre
 Love, Honor and Behave (1920) - Milton Robbin - Haberdasher
 Oh, Mabel Behave (1922) - Squire Peachem
 The Strangers' Banquet (1922) - Al Norton
 The Brass Bottle (1923) - Rapkin
 The Spoilers (1923) - 'Slapjack' Simms
 Hollywood (1923) - Himself
 The Destroying Angel (1923) - Max Weil
 The Day of Faith (1923) - Montreal Sammy
 Wild Oranges (1924) - Paul Halvard
 The Galloping Fish (1924) - George Fitzgerald
 The Woman on the Jury (1924) - Juror
 Love and Glory (1924) - Emile Pompaneau
 He Who Gets Slapped (1924) - Tricaud
 So Big (1924) - Jacob Hoogenduck
 Daddy's Gone A-Hunting (1925) - Oscar
 My Lady's Lips (1925) - Smike
 The Three Way Trail (1925)
 The Trouble with Wives (1925) - Al Hennessey
 Steppin' Out (1925) - John Durant
 Stage Struck (1925) - Buck
 Mike (1926) - Tad
 The American Venus (1926) - Hugo Niles
 The Road to Glory (1926) - James Allen
 Miss Brewster's Millions (1926) - Ned Brewster
 Good and Naughty (1926) - Bunny West
 The Show-Off (1926) - Aubrey Piper
 Everybody's Acting (1926) - Michael Poole
 Stranded in Paris (1926) - Count Pasada
 The Trunk Mystery (1926) - Jeff
 Mantrap (1926)
 Casey at the Bat (1927) - O'Dowd
 Drums of the Desert (1927) - Perkins
 For the Love of Mike (1927) - Herman Schultz
 Figures Don't Lie (1927) - 'Howdy' Jones
 Wife Savers (1928) - Tavern Keeper
 Gentlemen Prefer Blondes (1928) - Gus Eisman
 Sporting Goods (1928) - Mr. Jordan
 Chicken a La King (1928) - Horace Trundle
 Oh, Kay! (1928) - Shorty McGee
 Dreary House (1928) - Paul
 The Fall of Eve (1929) - Mr. Mack
 The Girl in the Show (1929) - Ed Bondell
 Sally (1929) - 'Pops' Shendorff
 Spring Is Here (1930) - Peter Braley
 Show Girl in Hollywood (1930) - Sam Otis - The Producer
 Bride of the Regiment (1930) - Tangy - Silhouette Cutter
 Kismet (1930) - Amru
 Her Majesty, Love (1931) - Otmar
 Playthings of Desire (1933) - Bromwell Jones
 Alice in Wonderland (1933) - White King
 Behind the Green Lights (1935) - Max Schultz, German Janitor
 The Headline Woman (1935) - Hugo Meyer
 Black Sheep (1935) - Mather
 Keystone Hotel (1935, Short) - Sterling, Chief of Police

References
Notes

Bibliography
  Wendy Warwick White, Ford Sterling - His Life and Films (McFarland & Company, 2007) 
  Simon Louvish, Keystone: The Life and Clowns of Mack Sennett (Faber & Faber, 2005)

External links

Literature on Ford Sterling

1883 births
1939 deaths
American male film actors
American male silent film actors
Deaths from diabetes
People from La Crosse, Wisconsin
Burials at Hollywood Forever Cemetery
Silent film comedians
Male actors from Wisconsin
20th-century American male actors
20th-century American comedians
American male comedy actors